Dead, Hot and Ready is the second full-length album by the Swedish heavy metal supergroup Witchery. Released in 1999, it was the last Witchery album with Mique on drums.

The album was called "fast-paced thrash with all the glorious, fun occult references you can handle," in a 2011 review by the Metalsucks site.

Track listing
All music by Jensen except where noted; all lyrics by Jensen. 
 Demonication - 2:31
 A Paler Shade of Death - 3:11	  
 The Guillotine - 2:38	  
 Resurrection - 4:49 (music by Jensen/Corpse)
 Full Moon - 3:46 (music by Jensen/D'Angelo)
 The Devil and the Damage Done - 3:52
 Dead, Hot and Ready - 2:43
 The Devil's Triangle - 2:36
 Call of the Coven - 3:47 (music by Jensen/Corpse)
 On a Black Horse thru Hell... - 3:40

Personnel
 Toxine – vocals
 Jensen – guitars
 Richard Corpse – solos and guitars
 Sharlee D'Angelo – electric bass guitar, last guitar solo on "The Devil and the Damage Done"
 Mique – drums

References

1999 albums
Witchery albums